In biochemistry, an orphan receptor is a protein that has a similar structure to other identified receptors but whose endogenous ligand has not yet been identified. If a ligand for an orphan receptor is later discovered, the receptor is referred to as an "adopted orphan". Conversely, the term orphan ligand refers to a biological ligand whose cognate receptor has not yet been identified.

Examples
Examples of orphan receptors are found in the G protein-coupled receptor (GPCR) and nuclear receptor families.

If an endogenous ligand is found, the orphan receptor is "adopted" or "de-orphanized". An example is the nuclear receptor farnesoid X receptor (FXR) and the GPCR TGR5/GPCR19/G protein-coupled bile acid receptor, both of which are activated by bile acids. Adopted orphan receptors in the nuclear receptor group include FXR, liver X receptor (LXR), and peroxisome proliferator-activated receptor (PPAR).  Another example of an orphan receptor site is the PCP binding site in the NMDA receptor, a type of ligand-gated ion channel.  This site is where the recreational drug PCP works, but no endogenous ligand is known to bind to this site.

GPCR orphan receptors are usually given the name "GPR" followed by a number, for example GPR1. In the GPCR family, nearly 100 receptor-like genes remain orphans.

Discovery
Historically, receptors were discovered by using ligands to "fish" for their receptors. Hence, by definition, these receptors were not orphans. However, with modern molecular biology techniques such as reverse pharmacology, screening of cDNA libraries, and whole genome sequencing, receptors have been identified based on sequence similarity to known receptors, without knowing what their ligands are.

References

External links
 
 
 

Receptors